Belind Këlliçi (born 25 January 1987) is an Albanian conservative politician. He was elected Member of Parliament for Tirana County in April 2021 general elections. He is the official candidate of the Democratic Party to run for Mayor of Tirana in the upcoming local elections, after winning in the Democratic Party Primaries.

Belind comes from a well-known traditional Tirana family, with a strong political legacy, as he is the grandson of Masar Këlliçi, MP representing Tirana and Durrës in the first Albanian Parliament in 1921. He graduated in the United States (Baltimore, Maryland). Belind was elected member of the Executive Board of the Democratic Party having most of the votes than any other candidate. Belind is also an alumnus of the U.S. Department of State International Exchange Program.

Early life and education 
Belind Këlliçi was born in Tirana on 25 January 1987. He started his political career, first as a member of the Democratic Party of Albania in 2009, after successfully completing his university studies in the Faculty of Management Science & Economics at Coppin State University, in Baltimore, Maryland, USA. He graduated with “Summa Cum-Laude” (with the highest honors) and earned the title “Student with the highest GPA at graduation”. As a result of high academic results, Belind became a member of “Sigma Beta Delta International Honors Society in Business” in 2008.
In 2009, he returned to Albania to join the Democratic Party of Albania and was part of the electoral campaign in the general elections of 2009. From 2009 to 2011, he worked at the National Agency of Tourism, part of the Ministry of Tourism and Culture. During these years Belind was part of several trainings and activities of FRPD and represented the youth of DP in different international activities.

Belind Këlliçi has been a national tennis champion for ages up to 18 years (2004) in Albania, and was part of "Coppin State University" tennis team from 2005 to 2009, representing his university in the MEAC (Mid-Eastern Athletic Conference) in U.S.A. In 2007 he earned the title "Scholar Athlete of the Year" from his university and MEAC Commissioner's All Academic Student

Political career 
In the local elections of 2011, Belind joined the campaign of DP candidate Lulzim Basha, who became the Mayor of Tirana. From 2011 to 2015, Belind worked in the Municipality of Tirana, at the General Directorate of Art & Culture, serving as the Head of Department of the City Events.
 
In 2014, in the capacity as Chairman of DP, Lulzim Basha appointed Belind, together with 21 other youngsters, as a National Coordinator of the Democratic Party.

During November 2014 - November 2015, Belind was also elected from the National Council of the DP in the position of Director for the Department of Former Persecuted People and Land Owners, thus becoming a member of the executive board of DP.

In November 2015, Belind Këlliçi resigned from all his positions within DP and entered the elections for Chairman of Forumi Rinor i Partisë Demokratike (FRPD), the youth organization of the Democratic Party of Albania. On December 6, 2015, he was elected chairman of FRPD, after a unique process for all the youth political organizations in Albania. He was elected chairman, after a first-time process with “one member, one vote” election, in a race of 20 national debates, in 20 different cities, where more than 11.000 FRPD members participated in the electoral process.

Youth of the Democratic Party 
In 2015, Belind Këlliçi was elected chairman of FRPD after a 'one member = one vote' process, which was implemented for the first time in an Albanian youth organization. More than 11,000 young democrats voted during this process. After being elected, Belind started to completely renovate the FRPD structures across the country, thus organizing elections with “one member, one vote” for the heads of the 55 FRPD branches across the country, elections for the National Council of the FRPD and the National Board, as well.

Since 2016, FRPD members have been part of many series of trainings regarding “The Rule of Law”, “Right Wing Ideology”, “History of the DP and FRPD”, “Guerrilla Marketing”, “Political Communication”, etc. One of the main achievements of FRPD, was the organization of its first Political Academy in 2016, which was made possible by the support and guidance of “Konrad Adenauer Stiftung” office in Tirana and which has now become a yearly tradition for FRPD.

Due to a great collaboration with YEPP (Youth of EPP) and other international youth organizations, FRPD in 2019 officially joined EDS (European Democrat Students – Official Student Association of EPP) as an Observer Member and in 2020 became full member in the Berlin Political Assembly.

In 2020, The Westminster Foundation for Democracy office in Tirana, in their yearly report, stated that FRPD has the biggest number of girls elected in leadership positions, among all youth organizations in Albania. The report stated that no other youth organization in Albania has so many women elected in office. The report also stated that FRPD is very open to marginalized minorities, thus making FRPD the most inclusive of all youth political organizations in Albania.

Belind has also attended a series of political trainings organized by Konrad Adenauer Stiftung, International Republican Institute, National Democratic Institute, Robert Schuman Institute, Jarl Hjalmarson Foundation, Eduardo Frei Foundation, Hanns Seidel Stiftung, etc. In 2021 Belind became an alumnus of the U.S. Department of State International Exchange Program.

During Belind Këlliçi's leadership, FRPD has held multiple protests against Edi Rama's government.

On July 17, 2021, during the National Convention of the Democratic Party of Albania, Belind Këlliçi declared that it was his last speech on a national convention as chairman of the Youth of Democratic Party, meaning that he is going leave the office.

In November 2021, former Chair of Democratic Party, Lulzim Basha announced new elections in FRPD, right before Sali Berisha's Pulpit with the young democrats. This announcement angered FRPD members. The latter joined Sali Berisha's movement. FRPD didn't obey Lulzim Basha's order and they didn't hold elections until one year later, in October 2022.

Belind left the position as chair of FRPD on 4 October 2022, right after Besart Xhaferri was announced winner of the elections inside the organization.

2021 parliamentary elections 
In February 2021, leader of the Democratic Party, Lulzim Basha appointed Belind Këlliçi as political leader of Tirana, representing Kombinat, Astir, Ndroq and Kashar.

In March 2021, the Democratic Party announced their MP candidates list. Belind Këlliçi was the 10th candidate in the Tirana County list of the Democratic Party

During the campaign, Belind Këlliçi was fined ALL 5 million because he didn't follow COVID-19 government rules, along with Edmond Spaho, Erion Veliaj and other politicians. As of 21 May 2021, the Administrative Court in Tirana ruled in favor of Belind Këlliçi by removing this fine.

After the 25 April elections, Belind Këlliçi was elected Member of Albanian parliament, with more than 11,601 votes. He was ranked 3rd in Tirana in the Democratic Party list and 12th in Albania overall. Belind was elected MP exactly 100 years after his great grandfather was elected MP for Tirana and Durrës in the first Albanian Parliament in April 1921.

Member of Parliament 
Belind Këlliçi took the Oath of Office of the Member of the Albanian Parliament on September 10, 2021, representing Tirana County. On the first day of the 10th legislature of the parliament, Belind was appointed member of the temporary Commission that verifies parliamentary terms.

Belind was a member of the Inquiry Committee on incinerators. He got very big attention after having a 2 hour debate with Prime Minister Edi Rama.

Steering Interim Commission of the Democratic Party 
On 11 December 2021, the National Assembly of the Democratic Party was called by the majority of the Party's delegates. Belind Këlliçi led the works of the National Assembly, which dismissed Lulzim Basha as chairman of the party.

On that day, Belind was appointed by the National Assembly as member of the Steering Interim Commission of the Democratic Party.

The National Assembly of the Democratic Party gathered again on April 30th 2022. Belind Këlliçi led the works of the Assembly again.

After the Commission's term came to an end, Belind Këlliçi was the most voted member of the Executive Board of the Democratic Party.

References 

Albanian politicians
1987 births
Living people
Democratic Party of Albania politicians
Members of the Parliament of Albania
Coppin State University alumni
People from Tirana